Kołbaskowo  (formerly , (historically): Colbitzow) is a village in Police County, West Pomeranian Voivodeship, in north-western Poland, close to the German border. It is the seat of the gmina (administrative district) called Gmina Kołbaskowo. As of 2006 the village has a population of 410.

The motorway at Kołbaskowo is the site of a major Schengen border crossing on the European route E28 connecting Berlin (Germany) with Szczecin and Gdańsk. The neighbouring village on the German side of the border is Pomellen, part of the Nadrensee municipality.

History
The oldest known mention of the village comes from 1243, when Duke Barnim I granted the local tithe to the Cistercian women monastery in Szczecin. The village was eventually granted to the Cistercian nuns in 1286. Its name comes from the male name Kołbasek, which in turn comes from the Polish word kiełbaska. Since the Middle Ages the area was part of Poland, the Duchy of Pomerania following Poland's fragmentation, Sweden, Prussia and Germany, before it became part of Poland again following the defeat of Nazi Germany in World War II in 1945.

Heritage monument
The most precious historic landmark of the village is the Romanesque Holy Trinity church with Gothic and Baroque interior, which was built in the 13th century with granite.

Communication
Kołbaskowo can be reached from Szczecin via the A6 autostrada and the National road (Droga krajowa) No. 13. The Bus line 81 leads to Siadło Górne, Przecław and Szczecin: Gumieńce, Kościuszko Square and Nowe Miasto.

Sports
The local football club is Zryw Kołbaskowo, founded in 1971. It competes in the lower leagues.

Notable people
  (1948–2016), Polish politician and activist, co-founder of the Solidarity movement in Szczecin, honorary citizen of Kołbaskowo

Gallery

References

Villages in Police County
Germany–Poland border crossings